Hydromedusa is a turtle genus in the family Chelidae, commonly known as the South American snake-necked turtles. They are quite closely related to the South American side-necked swamp turtles (Acanthochelys) and the snake-necked turtles of the Australian-Melanesian region (Chelodina), but less closely to the spine-necked river turtles of South America (Podocnemididae) which belong to a more modern lineage of Pleurodira.

Species 
This genus contains the following extant and fossil species:
 Brazilian snake-necked turtle, Cágado da Serra, Hydromedusa maximiliani
 Argentine snake-necked turtle, Cágado pescoço de cobra, Hydromedusa tectifera
 Hydromedusa casamayorensis , Salamanca and Sarmiento Formations, Argentina

References

 
Turtle genera
Turtles of South America
Reptiles described in 1830
Taxa named by Johann Georg Wagler
Taxonomy articles created by Polbot
Extant Selandian first appearances

Molina, F. J., & Leynaud, G. C. (2017). Thermoconformity strategy in the freshwater turtle Hydromedusa tectifera (Testudines, Chelidae) in its southern distribution area. Journal of Thermal Biology, 69, 178–183. https://doi.org/10.1016/j.jtherbio.2017.07.008